This is a list of all commanders, deputy commanders, senior enlisted leaders, and chiefs of staff of the United States Strategic Command.

Current combatant command staff
  Anthony J. Cotton, Commander
  Richard A. Correll, Deputy Commander
  Gregory J. Brady, Chief of Staff
  Jason A. Schmidt, Director, Human Capital (J1)
  Ricky L. Mills, Director, Intelligence (J2)
  John J. Nichols, Director, Global Operations (J3)
  Glenn T. Harris, Deputy Director, Global Operations

  Shane P. Strohl, Director, Logistics (J4)
  Anthony Carullo, Director, Plans and Policy (J5)
  John W. Weidner, Deputy Director, Plans
  Mark D. Behning, Deputy Director, Strategic Targeting and Nuclear Mission Planning (J5N)
   Elizabeth M. Durham-Ruiz, Director, Command, Control, Communications, and Computer (C4) Systems (J6)
   Jeffery B. Miller, Director, Joint Exercises, Training, and Assessments (J7)
   Robert J. Taylor, Director, Capability and Resource Integration (J8)

List of commanders of the United States Strategic Command

List of deputy commanders of the United States Strategic Command

List of senior enlisted leaders of the United States Strategic Command

List of chiefs of staff of the United States Strategic Command

See also
 United States Strategic Command
 Leadership of the United States Africa Command
 Leadership of the United States European Command
 Leadership of the United States Indo-Pacific Command
 Leadership of the United States Northern Command
 Leadership of the United States Space Command
 Leadership of the United States Cyber Command
 Leadership of the United States Transportation Command

References

Lists of American military personnel